Hayvenhurst is a  compound in the Encino neighborhood of the San Fernando Valley in California, United States. It became the home of the Jackson family, including Michael Jackson, who perfected the Moonwalk and recorded the albums Thriller and Off the Wall there.  The compound was purchased by Michael's father Joe Jackson in May 1971 after the first commercial successes of The Jackson 5. 

The estate is on Hayvenhurst Avenue, Encino, in Los Angeles' San Fernando Valley. Its centerpiece is a 5-bedroom, 7-bathroom, -building. It also includes three small stores that resemble a candy store, a puppet shop, and an ice cream shop. Additions to the property in the 1980s include a  Snow White and the Seven Dwarfs diorama, a movie theater, and a koi pond.

"Hayvenhurst" was also the name of an earlier palatial estate located in West Hollywood, constructed in 1907 by W. H. Hay, the subdeveloper of Crescent Heights and the eponym of Hayvenhurst Avenue.

History 
The Jackson family moved to Hayvenhurst from their home in Gary, Indiana, after living in various places around Los Angeles, including several hotels, the homes of Berry Gordy and Diana Ross, and a Mediterranean-style house at 1601 Queens Road in Hollywood Hills.

Michael Jackson lived at Hayvenhurst from 1971 until 1988 when he bought the Neverland Ranch at age 29. Off the Wall and Thriller were recorded at Hayvenhurst, and Michael Jackson undertook early development of his version of the Moonwalk there. It was once the home of Michael's famous chimpanzee, Bubbles. 

The family remained at Havenhurst. Jermaine Jackson lived there on and off for years. Joe Jackson left Hayvenhurst after the 1994 Northridge earthquake. In 2010, the house was appraised at $4.15 million, and then underwent extensive renovations. The following year, Katherine Jackson listed the compound for sale, asking "executors to negotiate the purchase of a new residence for her and the children, Paris, Prince and Michael Joseph Jr., known as Blanket". But the estate has remained in the Jackson family, and as of 2019 was occupied by Paris Jackson, Michael's daughter.

References 

Buildings and structures in Los Angeles
Michael Jackson